Man! A Journal of the Anarchist Ideal and Movement was an anarchist periodical published in San Francisco from 1933 to 1940.

Bibliography

External links 

 

Anarchist periodicals published in the United States
1933 establishments in California